Valdivia Province is one of two provinces of the southern Chilean region of Los Ríos (XIV). The provincial capital is Valdivia. Located in the province are two important rivers, the Calle-Calle / Valdivia River and the Cruces River. It is part of Northern Patagonia and its wild virgin forest embrace the Patagonian Cordillera following the river Calle Calle down to the Pacific Ocean. It is known in Patagonia by the term "Bosque Valdiviano", referring to the primitive forest of Valdivia with its native trees. These forests are present in some parts of Northern Patagonia, both in Chile and Argentina.

Municipalities
Valdivia
Lanco
Máfil
Panguipulli
Corral
Mariquina
Los Lagos
Paillaco

Geography and demography
Of these, 192,066 (74.1%) lived in urban areas and 67,177 (25.9%) in rural areas. Between the 1992 and 2002 censuses, the population grew by 10.9% (25,547 persons).

References

 
Provinces of Chile
Provinces of Los Ríos Region